Rwanda Education Board (REB) is Rwanda's national education assessment body.

References

Educational organisations based in Rwanda
2011 establishments in Rwanda
Organizations established in 2011
Organisations based in Kigali